John Haggerty III (born 6 February 1995) is a professional gridiron football punter for the Toronto Argonauts of the Canadian Football League (CFL).

Early life
Haggerty grew up in Sydney, Australia, where he played rugby, Australian rules football, and soccer. His biggest inspiration in sports was Kobe Bryant and he played football with Michael Dickson.

College career
After attending Prokick Australia, a program designed to train Australian athletes in gridiron football, Haggerty was recruited to the Western Kentucky Hilltoppers program where he played college football from 2019 to 2021. He set single-season program records for punting average in each of his three years, with 45.7 yards in 2020, 45.9 yards in 2019, and 48.7 yards in 2021.

Professional career
Haggerty was drafted in the first round, fourth overall by the Toronto Argonauts in the 2022 CFL Global Draft and signed with the team on 10 May 2022. Following 2022 training camp, he was named the team's punter, allowing Boris Bede to focus on placekicking. He played in his first career professional game on 16 June 2022, against the Montreal Alouettes, where he had four punts for a 51.2-yard average and scored two singles in the one-point victory.

Personal life
Haggerty and his wife, Spenser, have one son, Lincoln John Haggerty, who was born in July 2021.

References

External links
 Toronto Argonauts bio

1995 births
Living people
American football punters
Australian players of American football
Australian players of Canadian football
Canadian football punters
Toronto Argonauts players
Sportspeople from Sydney
Western Kentucky Hilltoppers football players